Stefan Stojačić (born February 20, 1989) is a Serbian professional basketball player.

His younger brother, Strahinja Stojačić, is also a basketball player. They played together in the 2010–11 season with Radnički Kragujevac.

Professional career

After playing for youth teams of Partizan, Stojačić moved to Mega Aqua Monta and signed his first professional contract in 2007.

Serbian national team
Stojačić won three gold medals with the Serbian junior national teams. He also played at the Stanković Cup in 2008.

References

External links

 Stefan Stojačić at abaliga.com
 Stefan Stojačić at eurobasket.com
 Stefan Stojačić at balkanleague.net

1989 births
Living people
ABA League players
Basketball League of Serbia players
KK Crvena zvezda players
KK Mega Basket players
KK Radnički Kragujevac (2009–2014) players
KK Vojvodina players
KK Vojvodina Srbijagas players
Serbian men's basketball players
Serbian men's 3x3 basketball players
Shooting guards
Basketball players from Novi Sad